Fulbert is a given name. Notable people with the name include:

 Fulbert of Cambrai, Bishop of Cambrai (died 956)
 Fulbert of Chartres, Bishop of Chartres (1006–1028)
 Fulbert of Falaise (fl. 11th century), maternal grandfather of William the Conqueror
 Abbé Fulbert Youlou (1917-1972), a Brazzaville-Congolese Roman Catholic priest, nationalist leader

French masculine given names